Preventice, Inc., formerly known as Boost Information Systems, Inc., was founded in 2007 by Jonathan Otterstatter, Scott Burrichter, Greg Wobig, and Dan Spors. The company is headquartered in Rochester, Minnesota.

Overview 
The company develops mobile to cloud-based health technologies for smartphone, tablets, and the web. Through collaborations with  Merck, Mayo Clinic, and Pfizer the company has released close to 40 applications for prescription medication management, cardiac care, sleep apnea, and diabetes management.

In August 2012, the U.S. Food and Drug Administration approved the BodyGuardian Remote Monitoring System, a series of small wearable monitors created by Preventice in collaboration with the Mayo Clinic.  The BodyGuardian system is to be used by doctors to track non-lethal arrhythmia or irregular heartbeats in ambulatory patients. The monitors are paired with a dedicated cell phone that allows doctors to check on a patient's heart rate at any time through a secure web site on their computers or via their iPad tablets.

References

Further reading

Mayo device helps monitor heart patients from afar Medical Marketing & Media, May 22, 2013
Preventice announces commercial availability of BodyGuardian Remote Patient Monitoring System The Wall Street Journal, May 10, 2013
Wear Your Doctor Time Magazine, March 14, 2013
CEOCFO magazine's interview with Preventice CEO, Jon Otterstatter CEOCFO Magazine, January 7, 2013
Remote heart monitor device could improve ER triage, orthopedics surgical care (video) MedCity News, December 27, 2012
Preventice, Mayo gear up to launch high-tech body sensor Business Journal, December 27, 2012
Remote monitoring firm excited about future The Post Bulletin, December 26, 2012
Samsung and Apple Duel in Enterprise Tech Business Week, December 13, 2012
M2M-Enabled Healthcare for Asthma, Heart Patients  Connected World Magazine, December 6, 2012
Locally developed patient monitor coming out soon  The Post-Bulletin, December 5, 2012
Preventice prepares to bring the BodyGuardian to market  HIMSS, December 4, 2012
Great Plains Software founder Burgum joins Preventice board  Minneapolis/St. Paul Business Journal, November 27, 2012
New Applications in EP: The BodyGuardian Remote Monitoring System  EP Lab Digest, November 2, 2012
10 Wearable Health Tech Devices To Watch  InformationWeek Healthcare, October 31, 2012
Healthcare Monitor Relies on Wearable Body Sensor Technologies  Design World, October 16, 2012
Wearable monitoring system provides clinical support to patients at home  EE Times, October 8, 2012
IT, health care come together  StarTribune Business, September 15, 2012
Preventice receives FDA clearance to market BodyGuardian Remote Monitoring System  EMR Daily News, September 11, 2012
FDA OKs Mayo Clinic’s BodyGuardian sensor for monitoring irregular heartbeat  MedCity News, September 11, 2012
Mayo Clinic Unveils New Heart Monitoring Device  ABC 6 News, September 11, 2012
Home monitoring system for heart patients gets FDA approval  The Post-Bulletin, September 11, 2012
Locally Made Remote Heart-Monitoring System Gets FDA OK  Twin Cities Business, September 11, 2012
FDA clears cardiac monitor from Preventice, Mayo Clinic  mobi health news, September 11, 2012
FDA clears Preventice's remote heart-tracking system  Minneapolis St. Paul Business Journal, September 10, 2012
Preventice gets 510(k) for mobile vitals monitor  FierceMedicalDevices, September 10, 2012
FDA approves new remote heart monitoring system  Star Tribune Health, September 10, 2012
App to help track your allergies  KARE 11 TV, July 12, 2012
Avery Tweaking its wearable sensors with Preventice  Telecare Aware, May 29, 2012
Health Monitoring Shows Healthy Growth  Connected World Magazine, May 28, 2012
Pasadena-based Avery Dennison Corp plans patch to monitor patients  SGV Tribune, May 21, 2012
Remote monitoring firm with Mayo ties announces manufacturing partner  MedCity News, May 21, 2012
Forget Google Glasses: Meet Wearable Health Monitors  InformationWeek Healthcare, April 12, 2012
Preventice turns to Mayo, life science partners to help develop mobile apps   InformationWeek Healthcare, December 16, 2011
Mobile health startup Preventice moving headquarters to Minneapolis   TECH {DOT} MN, December 14, 2011
Talent hunt brings app firm to Mpls  Minneapolis St. Paul Business Journal, November 18, 2011
Rochester-based mobile health startup introduces new video platform  TECH {DOT} MN, September 26, 2011
Mobile app brings doc into the equation  Healthcare IT News, May 4, 2011
Mobile health roundup  mobi health news, March 9, 2011
Mayo Clinic, Preventice collaborate on skin care app  FierceMobileHealthcare, March 4, 2011
Mayo Clinic, Preventice collaborate on skin care app  The Nursing Room, March 4, 2011

External links

American companies established in 2007
Companies based in Minnesota
Health software